Mike or Michael Reilly may refer to:

Politics
Michael Reilly (Wisconsin politician) (1869–1944), member of the U.S. House of Representatives from Wisconsin's 6th district
Michael Reilly (New York politician) (born 1973), member of the New York State Assembly for the 62nd District

Sports

Gridiron football
Mike Reilly (1960s linebacker) (1942–2019), American football linebacker
Mike Reilly (1980s linebacker)  (born 1959), American football linebacker
Michael Reilly (quarterback) (born 1985), American gridiron football quarterback
Mike Reilly (coach) (1899–1971), American football, basketball, and baseball player and coach

Other sports
Mike Reilly (umpire) (born 1949), Major League Baseball umpire
Mike Reilly (golfer) (born 1968), American professional golfer
Mike Reilly (ice hockey) (born 1993), American ice hockey defenseman 
Mike Reilly (coach) (1899–1971), American football, basketball, and baseball player and coach

Other
Mike Reilly (television personality)
Michael Reilly (character), a character in the Australian police drama Water Rats

See also
Mike Riley (disambiguation)
Michael Riley (disambiguation)